The  is a railway line between Hineno Station and Kansai Airport Station in Japan, operated by the West Japan Railway Company (JR West) and owned by Kansai International Airport Co., Ltd. between Rinkū Town and Kansai Airport. It opened on 15 June 1994.

Basic data
Railway signalling: Automatic
CTC centers: Kansai Airport Operation Control Center
CTC system: Kansai airport line CTC

Rolling stock
Local (Shuttle) and rapid service trains use 4-car 223-0/223-2500 series and 225-5000 series trainsets.
Kansai Airport Limited Express Haruka use 6- or 9-car 271 series and 281 series trainsets.
Nankai Electric Railway trains use the track between Rinkū Town and Kansai Airport.

Stations

History 
The Kansai Airport line opened in 1994.

Station numbering was introduced to the line in March 2018 with stations on the line being assigned JR-S45 through JR-S47.

References

External links
Access to Kansai Airport- JR West

Rail transport in Osaka Prefecture
Lines of West Japan Railway Company
Airport rail links in Japan
1067 mm gauge railways in Japan
Railway lines opened in 1994
1994 establishments in Japan